The Alentejana is a cattle breed from Portugal that was the main breed raised for meat in Southern Portugal historically. The Alentejana breed has the protected geographical status of DOC (Denominação de Origem Controlada) from the European Commission. Genetics show that it contains DNA from Africa that may have arrived during the era the region was under Muslim control. It is closely related to the Spanish Retinta breed.

The breed region is circumscribed almost exclusively to the Southern Portuguese Region of Alentejo, in both, High and Low Alentejo.

The race is represented by rustic, energetic and gentle animals that in the recent past were used to work.

Description

Forehead - Slightly convex, especially in the transverse direction.
Ears - Well set, horizontal and covered with long hairs on its inner surface.
Eyes - The flower of the faces.
Bevel - Slightly convex, or even straight, and well delineated.
Faces - dry, leaving the muzzle posted.
Muzzle - Developed, with mirror staining identical to that of other mucosal or slightly pigmented.
Neck - In males, is thick, short, horizontal, provided with barb that extends to a large fold from the chin to the cilhadouro, with only a slight slowdown after last the throat area. In females, is much less thick, narrow upper lip and barb less developed.
Withers - Medium in width and slightly protruding.
Back - Long and moderately wide.
Loin or kidney - For wide.
Croup - Long, of good width and anterior muscular regularly.
Tail - Fine, falling in regular smooth curve from its insertion and finished a tassel and hairy.
Breaststroke - For outstanding.
Backing - Alto, slightly convex, but extending and rounding gradually as approaches the abdominal region.
Flank - Short.
Udder - for developed and regularly implemented.
Lining - Long and developed.
States - Of medium size and thickness, and mus guided and regular upright.
Shoulder - Long and wide.
Arm and forearm - Strong.
Thigh - long and large but shallow muscle mass.
Buttocks - for tending to decline and arched.
Extremities (hands and feet) - solid, wide joints.
Nails - Well shaped, solid and smooth, whose color ranges from amber to fiery.

See also
Mertolenga
Longhorn

References

External links
http://autoctones.ruralbit.com/index.php?rac=1&esp=1&pais=pt

Cattle breeds
Cattle breeds originating in Portugal
Portuguese products with protected designation of origin